FC Niva Slavyansk-na-Kubani was a Russian football team from Slavyansk-na-Kubani. It played professionally from 1990 to 1997. Their best result was 10th place in the Zone 2 of the Russian Second Division in 1993.

Team name history
 1990–1991 – FC Golubaya Niva Slavyansk-na-Kubani
 1992–1997 – FC Niva Slavyansk-na-Kubani

External links
  Team history at KLISF

Association football clubs established in 1990
Association football clubs disestablished in 1998
Defunct football clubs in Russia
Sport in Krasnodar Krai
1990 establishments in Russia
1998 disestablishments in Russia